This is a list of international prime ministerial trips made by Mark Rutte, the 42nd and current Prime Minister of the Netherlands.

Summary of international trips

National trips are not included.

2010

2011

2012

2013

2014

2015

2016

2017

2018

2019

2020

2021

2022

2023

See also
 Foreign relations of the Netherlands

References

Lists of diplomatic trips
Dutch prime ministerial visits
Rutte